Favor Delivery is a same-day delivery and online food ordering platform headquartered in Austin, Texas. The company was founded in 2013 and was acquired by San Antonio, Texas-based regional supermarket chain H-E-B in 2018. Following the acquisition, Favor CEO, Jag Bath, was named chief digital officer of H-E-B while remaining Favor CEO.

Service area 

Starting by serving major cities in Texas, Favor expanded between 2013 and 2016 to serve a total of 23 cities in the United States and Canada. However, in June 2016 it pulled out of Philadelphia, Washington, DC, and 3 other major cities in the US, shut down operations in Toronto in December, and in January 2017 pulled out of the remaining cities it had served outside Texas. The company continued operations in 15 cities in Texas.

By November 2019, Favor operated in 130 cities across Texas.

References

External links 
 

Online food ordering
American companies established in 2013
Retail companies established in 2013
Transport companies established in 2013
Internet properties established in 2013
Companies based in Austin, Texas